Evan Seys (alternates: Yevan or Ievan) (1604–1685) was an eminent lawyer of his day who rose to national office under Oliver Cromwell as Attorney General, and served as a member of parliament after the Restoration. From c.1649 until his death he was involved in the politics of his native Glamorgan, and of Gloucestershire. He was a committed and active Protestant and an antiquarian scholar.

Family and education
Seys was the fourth son of Richard Seys of Swansea, Glamorgan and his wife Mary Evans. His father was a barrister of Lincoln's Inn. In 1638 Evan married Margaret, daughter of Robert Bridges of Woodchester, who died in 1651. He had a son, Richard, and daughters Margaret and Elizabeth.

Evan attended Cowbridge School until the age of 17, when in 1621 he went up to Christ Church, Oxford.

Political and legal career
Seys was Recorder of Gloucester in 1649 and a Bencher of Lincoln's Inn in 1652. He went on to hold legal office in Wales under the Protectorate and was a member of the committee for governing Glamorgan. This culminated in his becoming the Attorney General to Oliver Cromwell and serving as MP for Glamorgan during the evanescent rule of Richard Cromwell in 1659.

In 1659 he was part of a broad coalition preparing the restoration of Charles II. From 1661 to 1681 he was MP for Gloucester. He lived in the substantial house in the cathedral close built by Abraham Blackleech.

References

Davies, Iolo, A Certaine Schoole (Cowbridge: D. Brown and Sons, 1967), pp. 13–19 (career) and 349–59 (the speech)
Dodd, A. H., "'Tuning' the Welsh Bench, 1680", National Library of Wales Journal, Vol. VI/3 (Summer 1950)
Hopkin-James, Lemuel John, Old Cowbridge Borough, Church and School, pp 233–6 and 307 (Cardiff : Educational Pub. Co, 1922), available online from Google Books. Retrieved 24 July 2010: contains excerpts from Seys's school speech in Latin and in translation
James, Brian Ll. and Francis, David J., Cowbridge and Llanblethian Past and Present (Stewart Williams, Publishers, Barry and D. Brown & Sons Ltd., Eastgate, Cowbridge, 1979), p. 49 (on the family's origins)
Jenkins, Philip, The Making of a Ruling Class: The Glamorgan Gentry 1640–1790 (Cambridge University Press, 1983), pp. 101–39, 218–20, 231, 235, 261
Jenkins, Philip, "Anti-Popery on the Welsh Marches", Historical Journal, Vol. 23 (1980)
Jenkins, Philip, "'The Old Leaven': the Welsh Roundheads after 1660", Historical Journal, Vol. 24 (1981)
Lewis, Samuel, A Topographical Dictionary of Wales (1833) for the 1705 endowment
Prest, Wilfred R., The rise of the Barristers (1986), p. 160
Robbins,M., The Agricultural, Social and Cultural Interests of the gentry of South East Glamorgan: 1540–1640  University of Wales, Cardiff, PhD (1974)
Vale of Glamorgan Council: "Boverton Draft Conservation Area Appraisal": on the ruins of Boverton Place" (2009)
Victoria County History: Gloucestershire: Manor of Dymock (in publication)
 Will of Evan Seys (signed 1682, codicil 1684, proved 1684/5 at Prerogative Court at Canterbury). Index to will register at  National Archives PROB 11/379. Retrieved 24 July 2010.
The Cambrian Quarterly Magazine 1830, p. 172 on the oak
 Dryden's Absalom and Achitophel Pt 2 (1682): Worcester, by then first Duke of Beaufort, is eulogistically cast as "Bezaliel" lines 941–66. The Welsh he governs, "Kenites", in the biblical allegory, are also praised for their loyalty to the King: Dryden cannot have thought Seys representative of his nation. But their land is disparaged  as a "Rocky Province." The whole poem is a witty and highly readable satire on the Exclusion Crisis and The Popish Plot from the Royalist perspective. And Shakespeare's Henry the fourth part 2 caricatures country justices in the personae of "Shallow" and "Silence" – of Gloucestershire no less. Seys was way above these two in point of legal expertise, general erudition, sophistication, breadth of outlook etc.; but many of his colleagues on the Glamorgan Bench were not. These two classics add background and elaboration.

See also
 Article on Evan Seys by Clive Jenkins

1604 births
1685 deaths
Alumni of Christ Church, Oxford
Members of the Privy Council of England
Welsh politicians
Attorneys General for England and Wales
People educated at Cowbridge Grammar School
Members of the Parliament of England (pre-1707) for Gloucester
English MPs 1659
English MPs 1661–1679
English MPs 1679
English MPs 1680–1681
Members of the Parliament of England (pre-1707) for constituencies in Wales